Henry Horner (November 30, 1878 – October 6, 1940) was an American politician. Horner served as the 28th Governor of Illinois, serving from January 1933 until his death in October 1940. Horner was noted as the first Jewish governor of Illinois.

Early life 
Horner was born Henry Levy to Solomon Abraham Levy and Dilah Horner in Chicago. He assumed the Horner surname after his parents divorced in 1883. He attended the University of Chicago. Horner attended IIT Chicago-Kent College of Law and received his LLB in 1898. Horner was a lawyer and served as a probate judge from 1915 to 1931.

Political career
First elected governor in 1932, Horner served during the difficult years of the Great Depression. Because of a fiscal crisis in Illinois during his first term in office, he was forced to ask the General Assembly for new tax revenue. In 1933, he signed Illinois's first permanent sales tax law into effect with an inaugural rate of 2.0%. Horner also signed a bill in 1935 increasing the Illinois sales tax rate to 3.0%.

Horner's administration was marked by integrity and a strong commitment to both conservative fiscal management and the needs of the indigent and those in state institutions. His insistence on stopping graft and keeping state payrolls free of non-working patronage appointees put him at odds with the Democratic political organization of Chicago run by Patrick Nash and Mayor Edward Joseph Kelly. They backed a rival candidate in the 1936 primary, whom Horner defeated with the help of a large downstate vote.

Horner went on to win re-election in November 1936 and was now determined to defeat the Kelly-Nash machine. He supported the election of Scott W. Lucas to the Senate in 1938 to succeed retiring incumbent William H. Dieterich, who had proven to be anti-Semitic and somewhat pro-German.

Later life
Horner suffered a stroke four days before the November election and spent five months recovering in Florida before returning to Illinois, too late to mount the campaign he had wanted to lead against the re-election of Mayor Kelly. Horner's health wavered over the next year until a collapse in the summer of 1940. He convalesced in Winnetka and Highland Park, Illinois from June 1940 until his death, in early October. Horner was succeeded by Lt. Governor John H. Stelle, who had been one of his greatest political enemies. Horner was a member of Temple B'rith Sholom in Springfield, Illinois.

Legacies
Horner is interred at Zion Gardens Cemetery in the Mt. Mayriv section, a Jewish cemetery in the Dunning neighborhood of Chicago. A Jewish summer camp in Ingleside, a suburb of Chicago, is named Camp Henry Horner after him. Horner, a lifelong bachelor, collected memorabilia related to Abraham Lincoln and bequeathed it to the people of Illinois. The Horner Collection is now stored and partly displayed in the Abraham Lincoln Presidential Library and Museum in Springfield, Illinois. Horner Park, located in Chicago, is a  facility bordered by Montrose Avenue to the north, Irving Park Road to the south, California Avenue to the west, and the north branch of the Chicago River to the east. The Governor Horner State Memorial is located in Horner Park. The Chicago Housing Authority built the Henry Horner Homes, a public housing project on Chicago's near–west side; named in honor of Governor Horner in 1957.

Books 
 (1969) Thomas B. Littlewood, Horner of Illinois. Northwestern University Press.
 (2007) Charles J. Masters, Governor Henry Horner, Chicago Politics, And The Great Depression. Southern Illinois University Press. .

References

External links 
 
 Henry Horner Collection at the Lincoln Presidential Library and Museum

1878 births
1940 deaths
Democratic Party governors of Illinois
Illinois state court judges
Jewish American state governors of the United States
Politicians from Chicago
University of Chicago alumni
Chicago-Kent College of Law alumni